Gutenburg Castle (also Gutenberg, Guttenberg, Weitersheim, or Weithersheim), is the ruin of a hill castle above the village of Gutenberg in the county of Bad Kreuznach in the German state of Rhineland-Palatinate.

History 
The castle is first recorded in 1213 as castro Weitersheim. In 1334 the counts of Sponheim (Lower County of Sponheim) sold the castle, which had meanwhile been renamed the Gutenburg. After the sale it underwent a major conversion. Following the extinction of the House of Sponheim (the Kreuzenach line died out in 1414 and the Starkenburg line in 1437) the castle went to the Lower Sponheim lords (mainly the Margraviate of Baden and Electoral Palatinate). The castle lost its importance over time, was destroyed during the Thirty Years' War and fell into ruins. In the copperplate by Daniel Meisner in the Thesaurus philopoliticus (published 1623f.) it is already portrayed as a ruin.

Present day 
Today the castle ruins are in private ownership.

Layout 
The castle consisted of an inner ward completely surrounded by a ring-shaped outer ward, protected by curtain walls with mural towers as well as a neck ditch. Considerable sections of the wall remain visible today.

Literature 
 Alexander Thon, Stefan Ulrich, Achim Wendt: „… wo trotzig noch ein mächtiger Thurm herabschaut“ - Burgen im Hunsrück und an der Nahe. 1st edn. Verlag Schnell und Steiner, Regensburg, 2013, pp. 78–81.
 Friedrich-Wilhelm Krahe: Burgen des deutschen Mittelalters – Grundriss-Lexikon. Sonderausgabe. Flechsig Verlag, Wurzburg, 2000, p. 236.

External links 

 The history of the castle 
 Gutenburg Castle at alleburgen.de
 
 

Castles in Rhineland-Palatinate
Heritage sites in Rhineland-Palatinate
Buildings and structures in Bad Kreuznach (district)
Castles in the Hunsrück